West Footscray railway station is located on the Sunbury line in Victoria, Australia. It serves the western Melbourne suburb of West Footscray, and it opened on 1 October 1888 as Footscray West. It was renamed West Footscray on 1 September 1912.

Two dual gauge tracks operate north of the station, forming the South Kensington – West Footscray freight line, linking the Port of Melbourne and other freight terminals to the rest of the state. The tracks also form part of the Melbourne – Sydney and Melbourne – Adelaide standard gauge lines. The Regional Rail Link lines operate to the south of the station.

In 1976, the original station buildings were reconstructed. In 2013, the station was rebuilt 200 metres further west, to accommodate two lines to the south as part of the Regional Rail Link project. On 14 October of that year, the new station opened, with the old station demolished soon after.

A third platform has been built to the north of the existing island platform, as part of the Metro Tunnel project, to allow services to terminate and return. In late 2018, work commenced and, on 6 July 2020, the platform opened.

Facilities, platforms and services

West Footscray has one island platform with two faces and one side platform. Access to the platforms is provided by stairs, lifts and ramps from an overhead footbridge, which also contains a cycling path. It is serviced by Metro Trains' Sunbury line services. Express services do not stop at West Footscray.

Platform 1:
  all stations services to Flinders Street.

Platform 2 (currently closed):
 Formerly Platform 1 up until the side platform opened in July 2020. To be reopened as a turnback platform upon opening of the Metro Tunnel in 2025.

Platform 3:
  all stations services to Watergardens and Sunbury. Was formerly Platform 2.

By late 2025, it is planned that trains on the Sunbury line will be through-routed with those on the Pakenham and Cranbourne lines, via the new Metro Tunnel.

Transport links

CDC Melbourne operates three routes via West Footscray station, under contract to Public Transport Victoria:
 : Laverton station – Footscray
 : Laverton station – Footscray
 : Laverton station – Footscray station

Transit Systems Victoria operates two routes via West Footscray station, under contract to Public Transport Victoria:
 : Williamstown – Moonee Ponds Junction
  : Footscray – Newport station (Saturday and Sunday mornings only)

Gallery

References

External links
 
 Rail Geelong gallery

Former rail freight terminals in Victoria (Australia)
Railway stations in Melbourne
Railway stations in Australia opened in 1888
Railway stations in the City of Maribyrnong